Multum Accountants Ladies Cycling Team is a Belgian women's road bicycle racing team which participates in elite women's races. The team was established in 2012.

Team roster

Major results
2014
Erondegemse Pijl (Erpe-Mere), Ann-Sophie Duyck
Stage 2 Trophée d'Or Féminin, Ann-Sophie Duyck

2022
De Pinte Road Race, Julie Stockman
Berchem Road Race, Jessy Druyts
Provincial Championship Antwerpen, Road Race, Jessy Druyts
GP Peter Boone, Julie Stockman

National Champions
2014
 Belgium Time Trial, Ann-Sophie Duyck

2015
 Israel Time Trial, Paz Bash

2018
 Argentina Time Trial, Estefania Pilz

2022
 Israel U23 Time Trial, Nofar Maoz
 Belgium U23 Road Race, Sara Maes

References

External links

UCI Women's Teams
Cycling teams based in Belgium
Cycling teams established in 2012